The Oregon Trail is a 1936 American Western film directed by Scott Pembroke for Republic Pictures and starring John Wayne. It is a lost film with no known prints remaining. In 2013, film collector Kent Sperring discovered 40 photographs that were taken during the making of the film. The Oregon Trail started production on November 29, 1935, and was filmed at Alabama Hills.

Plot
John Wayne plays retired army captain John Delmont, who discovers from his father's journal that he was left to die by a renegade, and vows to hunt down the killer.

Cast
John Wayne as Capt John Delmont
Ann Rutherford as Anne Ridgeley
Joseph W. Girard as Col. Delmont 
Yakima Canutt as Tom Richards
Frank Rice as Red
E. H. Calvert as Jim Ridgeley
Ben Hendricks Jr. as Maj. Harris
Harry Harvey as Tim
Fern Emmett as Minnie
Jack Rutherford as Benton
Marian Ferrell as Sis
Roland Ray as Markey
Gino Corrado as Forrenza
Edward LeSaint as Gen. Ferguson
Octavio Giraud as Don Miguel

See also
 List of lost films

References

External links

 

1936 films
1936 Western (genre) films
1936 lost films
American Western (genre) films
American black-and-white films
Films directed by Scott Pembroke
Lost Western (genre) films
Lost American films
Republic Pictures films
1930s English-language films
1930s American films